Bren Esports is a Southeast Asian professional esports organization based in the Philippines. It has competitive teams in Mobile Legends: Bang Bang, CS:GO, PUBG, League of Legends, Overwatch, Hearthstone, Clash Royale, Arena of Valor, Rules of Survival, Valorant, and Tekken 7. In the Philippine esports league The Nationals, the team competes as Bren EPro. The organization was founded on 16 August 2017 by Bernard "Bren" Chong who is part of the Chong clan that owns World Balance. He is currently in hiding in the United States and have yet to face charges of human trafficking in the Philippines.

Arena of Valor 
On 1 October 2018, Bren Esports participated at the Arena of Valor tournament along with four team from Singapore, Malaysia and fellow Filipino team Maxbox Gaming in Philippines for the semi and grand finals of Arena of Valor's Cup Season 3.

Mobile Legends: Bang Bang (MLBB)

History 
Bren Esports's Mobile Legends team competes in the local tournaments for the MPL.

On 22 July 2018, Bren Esports acquired the full Aether Main roster which consisted of YellyHaze, Pein, Ribo, Yuji, Coco and 666. The 6-man roster won the team's first championship title on 29 July 2019 at the Mobile Legends: Bang Bang Southeast Asia Cup (MSC) 2018 held at the Jakarta International Expo in Indonesia.

From 12 January – 13 January 2019, the eight Filipino participant teams gathered at the Ayala Malls Circuit Makati for the Season 3 of MPL (2019) which was held at Makati, Philippines.

On 17 January 2019, 666 left the roster and was later replaced by Ejhay who joined the roster on 27 February 2019. On 18 July 2019, Pein left the team and was later replaced by Teng. On 29 October, Teng, Yuji and YellyHaze's departure was announced, leaving Ribo and Coco as the two remaining members from the previous Aether Main roster.

Roster Changes Prior to the M2 World Championship 
On 10 January 2020, KarlTzy, Pheww and Lastii joined the player roster with the addition of Duckey who signs-up to become the head coach. FlapTzy later joined the team on 2 July 2020. At that time, Coco changed his role from becoming part of the official playing roster to analyst.
In October 2020, they won the championship of MPL Season 6 in a best of 7 series, winning against Smart Omega Esports 4 games to 2. This was their second title since Aether Main and their first as the Bren franchise.
On 23 January 2021, Bren Esports were the champions for the M2 World Championships held in Singapore, winning against Burmese Ghouls 4 games to 3. The team had to climb up from the lower bracket by defeating two Indonesian powerhouse teams, RRQ Hoshi and Alter Ego to arrange a rematch against Burmese Ghouls. The Bren Esports team won $140,000 from the $300,000 prize pool money, with another $3,000 awarded to the MVP of the match, Carry Karl "KarlTzy" Nepomuceno.

During the Offseason on 6 December 2021, M2 World Champions MVP Karl Gabriel "KarlTzy" Nepomuceno announces his departure from Bren Esports. He has spent 4 seasons with Bren, joining in Season 5, winning a Esports Gold Medal in the 2019 Southeast Asian Games, the MPL Philippines Season 6 Champion, and M2 World Championship Finals MVP. On 11 December 2021, Ejhay left the team and later became the coach for the Sunsparks MLBB team.

Bren Victress 
In June 2019, all the female members of its team got third place in the Female Esports League of Mobile Legends (FSL) which was held at Singapore. Also in June 2019, Bren Esports participated in MSC 2019 at the Smart Araneta Coliseum. On the first day of competition, Bren Esports beat the Team Resolution of Myanmar. In the second day of competition, team Overclockers of Vietnam defeated Bren Esports causing them to be eliminated.

Tournament results

Current roster

Valorant

History 
In September 2021, Bren Esports qualified for VCT from SEA Championship but were unable to secure travel visas for the LAN event. The team was later acquired by another esports organization, Team Secret.

Controversies

Bernard Chong 
In August 2 2022, Bernard "Bren" Chong was accused of drug trafficking. He is wanted by the authorities and a Manila court. He is not trialed or arrested 'till this day.

Rape Accusations 
In November 16, 2022, a Facebook post accused 3 BREN players (KyleTzy, FlapTzy, and Jowm) of rape. There is no formal and/or legal action against the three BREN players and are not dropped of by the organization.

See also
 World Balance

References 

Esports teams established in 2018
Esports in the Philippines
Esports teams based in the Philippines
2018 establishments in the Philippines
Arena of Valor teams
Mobile Legends: Bang Bang teams
Valorant teams